The  is a commuter railway line in Kanagawa Prefecture, Japan, operated by the private railway operator Izuhakone Railway. The line connects Odawara Station in the city of Odawara with the Daiyūzan Station in the city of Minamiashigara.

Stations

Rolling stock

, the line is operated using a fleet of seven three-car 5000 series electric multiple unit (EMU) trainsets.

History
The Daiyūzan Line was merged with the Sunzu Line on August 23, 1941, and became part of the Izuhakone Railway from June 1, 1957. From November 25, 1976, the power rating on the line was raised from 600 volts to 1,500 volts. Automatic ticket gates were installed on all stations by 2003, and were upgraded to accept both the Suica and PASMO IC Card systems by March 2007.

See also
 List of railway lines in Japan

References

 Harris, Ken and Clarke, Jackie. Jane's World Railways 2008-2009. Jane's Information Group (2008).

External links

  

Railway lines in Kanagawa Prefecture

Izuhakone Railway
Railway lines opened in 1925
1067 mm gauge railways in Japan
1925 establishments in Japan